The Pamunu people were tenant farmers of rice paddies in Sri Lanka's history. They are sometimes referred to as a sub-caste of the Govigama caste.

History
Ancient rock inscriptions of Sri Lanka and historical literature refer to this community as Pamunu Parapuru in contexts such as vahal, sarak, pamunu parapuru, which translates into English as "slaves, oxen and heritable agricultural labour" (EZ III.87,105,126& 132).

Based on their region of residence these communities have now been mostly absorbed by the Bathgama or Govigama castes. The word Pamunu still survives in Sri Lankan family names and place names such as Pamunugama, Pamunuvita, and Pamunuva. However, in the 20th century many of these have been changed to Bamunu'', to convey an association with Brahmins.

References
 EZ (Epigraphia Zeylanica) Colombo Museum Sri Lanka

Sinhalese castes